Alexander Lungwitz (born 4 August 2000) is a German footballer who plays as a left-back for FC St. Pauli II.

Career
Lungwitz made his professional debut for Bayern Munich II in the 3. Liga on 26 September 2020, starting in the away match against SC Verl, which finished as a 0–3 loss.

On 10 June 2022, Lungwitz joined 3. Liga club Würzburger Kickers. The season ended with relegation to the Regionalliga Bayern and he left the club afterwards.

References

External links
 
 
 
 
 

2000 births
Living people
Footballers from Munich
German footballers
Germany youth international footballers
Association football fullbacks
SpVgg Greuther Fürth II players
SpVgg Greuther Fürth players
FC Bayern Munich II players
Würzburger Kickers players
FC St. Pauli II players
3. Liga players
Regionalliga players